Revolver "Shalashaska" Ocelot is a recurring fictional character in Konami's Metal Gear video game series. Throughout the series, he takes on a variety of roles: the archenemy of Solid Snake, the best friend of Naked Snake, the right-hand man of Liquid Snake and Solidus Snake, and a mentor to Venom Snake. Ocelot has been well received by video game publications for his role as a central villain in the franchise, and has often been considered one of its most important characters for his connections with various characters.

Appearances

Metal Gear Solid
 is introduced in the video game Metal Gear Solid as a gunslinger-themed member of the FOXHOUND terrorists involved with the hostile revolt on Shadow Moses Island which housed Metal Gear REX, serving as the team's interrogation expert and their leader Liquid Snake's right-hand man. He challenges Solid Snake to a gunfight in the game's first boss encounter, but their fight ends with Ocelot losing his right hand from an encounter with the Cyborg Ninja. Despite his loss, Ocelot later appears to torture Snake after Snake is captured. During Snake's torture, Ocelot reveals he was originally from the former Soviet Union and a former member of Spetsnaz, secretly wishing for Liquid's and Big Boss's dream world as well. Ocelot is the sole surviving member of FOXHOUND by the game's end. After the ending credits, it's revealed that he's in league with the U.S. President George Sears.

Metal Gear Solid 2: Sons of Liberty
During the game's introductory Tanker Chapter, he is seemingly under Sergei Gurlukovich's employ, but ends up betraying his old friend when Ocelot hijacks Metal Gear RAY, framing Snake and Otacon for the deed. During the game's main Plant Chapter, Ocelot then forms part of the terrorist group "Sons of Liberty" with Solidus Snake but ends up betraying the former President as well after revealing his true allegiance to the Patriots, a group that controls the United States. Shortly afterwards, Ocelot is taken over by Liquid and escapes from Snake, Solidus and Raiden to kill the Patriots' leaders.

Metal Gear Solid 3: Snake Eater
His encounters with Naked Snake are why he acquires a preference for revolvers (due to a tendency to absorb the gun's recoil with his elbow being more suited to shooting revolvers). Throughout the game, Ocelot's constant challenges with Snake eventually turn into a friendly rivalry. He is revealed to be , The Boss's illegitimate child. After the deaths of Volgin and The Boss, Ocelot is revealed to be a triple agent, taking orders from the Philosophers and the KGB, while also receiving orders from the Director of Central Intelligence. He was supposed to intercept and assist Snake, a mission he failed when another agent of the Philosophers, EVA, got there first.

Metal Gear Solid: Portable Ops
Initially in league with FOX's insurgency leader Gene, Ocelot assassinates the DCI in order to "end" the Philosophers and reports to someone that invites him to join the Philosophers' reorganized American branch.

Metal Gear Solid 4: Guns of the Patriots
He deliberately uses self-hypnosis and nanomachines to act as Liquid's mental doppelgänger to trick the Patriots' AIs. As "Liquid", Ocelot establishes a parent company that runs the four largest PMCs, fighting for the Patriots' control over the world. After hijacking the Patriots' systems, Ocelot's PMCs engage Old Snake. After Snake and Otacon use Naomi Hunter's FOXALIVE virus to delete the Patriots' AIs, Ocelot challenges Snake to a fistfight and appears to die from exhaustion after the final fight; however, Ocelot's death was actually caused by the new FOXDIE strain that Drebin injected into Snake.

Metal Gear Solid V

Ground Zeroes
Revolver Ocelot makes a non-canonical appearance in Metal Gear Solid V: Ground Zeroes during the "Deja vu" sequence.

The Phantom Pain
The character canonically appears in Metal Gear Solid V: The Phantom Pain to assist Venom Snake and the Diamond Dogs. He plays a key role in facilitating Big Boss's deception, subjecting both himself and Snake to hypnosis to convince themselves Snake is Big Boss, and aiding Big Boss's and Snake's escape from a hospital in Cyprus. Ocelot acts as the Diamond Dogs' interrogator, but frequently clashes with Kazuhira Miller over matters involving Skull Face and White Mamba. Ultimately, Ocelot declares his support for Big Boss's plan to wage covert war, foreshadowing his involvement in later Metal Gear Solid games.

Behind the scenes
Introduced in Metal Gear Solid, Ocelot is normally clothed in a duster, spurs and gunbelts, the traditional garb of gunslingers in spaghetti westerns, as well as a black armband on his left arm, and wields the Colt Single Action Army revolver, which he refers to as "the greatest handgun ever made". Designing the character, Hideo Kojima wanted to add Western tones to a character resulting in Ocelot's appearance, which is based on that of veteran Western film actor Lee Van Cleef. For Metal Gear Solid 2, Yoji Shinkawa originally intended to give Ocelot a cybernetic arm in place of the one Gray Fox took from him, but this idea was not used as the staff intended to have Ocelot use the arm of Liquid Snake. While Kojima acknowledged fans finding ridiculous the idea of Liquid's arm possessing Ocelot's mind, Kojima promised to answer the reason behind it in Metal Gear Solid 4.

In the original Metal Gear Solid, Revolver Ocelot was voiced by Kōji Totani in the Japanese version and Pat Zimmerman (credited as Patric Laine in the PlayStation release) in the English version. Both actors would reprise the role in Metal Gear Solid 2. The character's young version in Metal Gear Solid 3 was voiced by Takumi Yamazaki for the Japanese version and Josh Keaton in the English version. Due to Koji Totani's death in 2006, the character was voiced by Banjō Ginga in Metal Gear Solid 4 and Ikuya Sawaki in the Metal Gear Solid: Digital Graphic Novel recreations while Pat Zimmerman continued the role in the English version. In Metal Gear Solid V, the character was voiced by Troy Baker in the English version while Satoshi Mikami dubbed the character's voice for the Japanese version. Over the years, the character's motion capture have been performed by Taro Kazanawa, Kenichi Yoshida, Bill Yokoyama, Troy Baker and Matthew Carlsen.

Reception
The character of Revolver Ocelot has received a positive response by video game publications based on his role as an antagonist. He is one of the only characters to appear in almost every Metal Gear Solid game and is thus considered "one of the only characters to have a major role in all five Metal Gear Solid titles" by Game Informer. Official U.S. PlayStation Magazine called Revolver Ocelot underrated in comparison to Final Fantasy VII iconic antagonist Sephiroth, describing Ocelot as "just a persistent, sneaky, and cool villain. Heck, just watch the MGS3 trailer and you'll see that he was a badass even in the 60's."  G4's Filter placed him at number ten in their top list of video game villains in 2002. Ocelot ranked 28th on IGN's top list of video game villains. Guinness World Records Gamer's Edition listed Liquid Ocelot as ninth in their list of "top 50 video game villains".

Ocelot has been frequently featured in the lists of best Metal Gear villains. In 2008, he placed seventh in IGN's top list of Metal Gear Solid boss battles, and second on the top list of Metal Gear villains. Including him on their 2007 list of the best Metal Gear bosses, GameSpot called him one of the most important characters from the story alongside Solid Snake and Big Boss. In 2008, the torture he makes in Metal Gear Solid was listed by GameSpy as one of the best moments from the game due to how Ocelot toys with Snake and how difficult it is to pass it besides how significant is the outcome for the rest of the game. In response to his role in Metal Gear Solid 3, GameSpy called Ocelot one of the "series mainstay", hoping he would become an entertaining opponent.

According to Edge magazine, with Liquid Ocelot "Kojima has forged a superb villain, far more complete than in MGS2." He was also listed by IGN as one of the fictional characters who required his own spin-off. GamesRadar too praised his role as Revolver/Liquid Ocelot, placing as seventh on their 2013 list of best villains in video game history. Ocelot's change to his Liquid Ocelot alter-ego persona of Liquid Snake was opined by GameSpy to be one of the most nonsensical events from the Metal Gear series, but they still praised his action scenes at the start of Metal Gear Solid 2. UGO.com speculated that, because of being born from the medium The Sorrow, Ocelot could communicate with dead people which ended in Liquid Snake taking possession of his body. GamePro described the final fight against Liquid Ocelot as "epic" even as he became "a punching bag" in the final phase. Furthermore, UGO.com listed this fight as the seventh best cutscene ever in 2011, owing to the fighting styles employed and the interaction between the two fighters. On the other hand, 1UP.com listed such fight in their article about the 13 "most dumbass" boss battles for its simple style in comparison to other more challenging bosses from Metal Gear Solid 3 and its excessive length for a hand-to-hand fight between two old people. 1UP.com also listed the scenes from the games in which Liquid Ocelot controls the PMC's weapons to attack the protagonists and his imitation of Liquid Snake's death from Metal Gear Solid as one of the most surprising moments in the game. VentureBeat were bemused by Ocelot's portrayal in Metal Gear Solid V, writing how he was "calm and the voice of reason" instead of being an "eccentric, sadistic man". They theorized, however, that Ocelot was merely being himself and showing his true allegiances with Big Boss, rather than working as a triple agent or being under self-hypnosis akin to his previous appearances.

References

Amputee characters in video games
Characters designed by Yoji Shinkawa
Cyborg characters in video games
Fictional amputees
Fictional Central Intelligence Agency personnel
Fictional KGB agents
Fictional Russian people in video games
Fictional Soviet people
Fictional Soviet–Afghan War veterans
Fictional Spetsnaz personnel
Fictional businesspeople in video games
Fictional characters with dissociative identity disorder
Fictional commanders
Fictional criminals in video games
Fictional double agents
Fictional hypnotists and indoctrinators
Fictional immigrants to the United States
Fictional majors
Fictional gunfighters in video games
Fictional marksmen and snipers
Fictional mass murderers
Fictional members of secret societies
Fictional mercenaries in video games
Fictional military personnel in video games
Fictional military spies
Fictional police officers in video games 
Fictional private military members
Fictional secret agents and spies in video games
Fictional soldiers in video games
Fictional terrorists
Fictional torturers and interrogators
Konami antagonists
Male characters in video games
Male video game villains
Metal Gear characters
Orphan characters in video games
Video game bosses
Video game characters introduced in 1998
Western (genre) gunfighters
Western (genre) outlaws